The Rheinmetal Seahawk is the maritime adaptation of Rheinmetal's remotely controlled weapon system.  A range of calibers can be mounted on the system.

According to Jane's Defence Weekly the system uses the same sensors and servos as the manufacturer's larger naval guns.  The manufacturer can provide its low-weight version, mounting an autocannon of up to 40mm, or an ultralight version of the mounting, suitable for mounting machine guns or automatic grenade launchers on small patrol boats.

The mounting is capable of allowing the operator to electronically switch ammunition from two different magazines.

Sensors include an infrared camera, a low-light camera, and a laser range finder.

References

Remote weapon stations